The National Federation of Workers' Councils (MOSz) is a national trade union center in Hungary. It was formed in 1989 and has a membership of 56,000 in 12 branches.

Most members are from small to medium-sized businesses in the private sector. The MOSz is affiliated with the International Trade Union Confederation, and the European Trade Union Confederation.

References

External links
Official site

European Trade Union Confederation
International Trade Union Confederation
National trade union centers of Hungary
Trade unions established in 1989